The Austin Bruins are a Tier II junior ice hockey team in the North American Hockey League's Central Division. The Bruins play their home games in the Riverside Arena in Austin, Minnesota.

History
The Bruins were an expansion team that first played in the North American Hockey League (NAHL) in the 2010–11 season. On January 19, 2012, it was announced the team signed a three-year deal to continue play in Austin.

Season-by-season records

Playoffs
2012
Divisional Semifinals, Austin Bruins defeated Alexandria Blizzard 3-games-to-1
Divisional Finals, Bismarck Bobcats defeated Austin Bruins 3-games-to-1
2013
Divisional Semifinals, Austin Bruins defeated Minot Minotauros 3-games-to-1
Divisional Finals, Bismarck Bobcats defeated Austin Bruins 3-games-to-1
2014
Divisional Semifinals,  Austin Bruins defeated Minot Minotauros 3-games-to-1
Divisional Finals,  Austin Bruins defeated Bismarck Bobcats 3-games-to-2
Robertson Cup Semifinals, Austin Bruins defeated Topeka RoadRunners 2-games-to-1
Robertson Cup Finals, Fairbanks Ice Dogs defeated Austin Bruins 2-games-to-0
2015
Round 1 Series, Austin Bruins defeated Aberdeen Wings 3-games-to-0
Robertson Cup Quarterfinals, Austin Bruins defeated Minot Minotauros 3-games-to-2
Robertson Cup Semifinals, Austin Bruins defeated Lone Star Brahmas 2-games-to-1
Robertson Cup Finals, Minnesota Wilderness defeated Austin Bruins 2-games-to-0
2016
Division Semifinals, Austin Bruins defeated Minot Minotauros 3-games-to-1
Divisional Finals, Bismarck Bobcats defeated Austin Bruins 3-games-to-2
2018
Division Semifinals, Austin Bruins defeated Minnesota Wilderness 3-games-to-1
Division Finals, Minot Minotauros defeated Austin Bruins 3-games-to-0
2019
Division Semifinals, Aberdeen Wings defeated Austin Bruins 3-games-to-1

References

External links
Official Website
Austin Bruins Facebook

North American Hockey League teams
Ice hockey clubs established in 2010
North American Hockey League
Amateur ice hockey teams in Minnesota
Mower County, Minnesota
2010 establishments in Minnesota
Austin, Minnesota